Live at the Talk of the Town may refer to:

Live at the Talk of the Town (Stevie Wonder album)
Live at the Talk of the Town (The Seekers album)
Live at the Talk of the Town, album by Blue Mink
Live at the Talk of the Town, album by Rolf Harris
Live at the Talk of the Town, album by Cliff Richard
Live at the Talk of the Town, album by Frankie Vaughan
Live at the Talk of the Town, album by Raphael
Live at Talk of the Town, album by Shirley Bassey
Tom Jones Live! at the Talk of the Town, album by Tom Jones

See also
Live at London's Talk of the Town, album by Diana Ross and The Supremes
Live at London's Talk of the Town (The Temptations album)